Ricky R. Grundy (January 30, 1959 – July 27, 2015), who went by the stage name Rickey Grundy, was an American gospel musician and leader of The Rickey Grundy Chorale. He started his music career in 1988, with Sparrow Records releasing Spirit Come Down, and they released two albums that placed on the Billboard magazine Gospel Albums chart. Grundy died on July 27, 2015, after a season of health complications.

Early life
Grundy was born in Los Angeles, California, United States graduated from high school at fifteen, and went on to the University of Southern California to study at their conservatory of music.

Music career
His music recording career started in 1979 when he wrote "Call Him Up" for Keith Pringle and the Pentecostal Community Choir.  He served as a pianist and wrote several songs for Pringle and was the lead vocalist on Pringle's 1988 song "I'm So Grateful."

Grundy struck out on his own in 1988 with the release of Spirit Come Down by Sparrow Records, and this charted on the Billboard magazine Gospel Albums chart at No. 22. The subsequent album, The Rickey Grundy Chorale, was released in 1990, and placed at No. 10 on the aforementioned chart. Grundy portrayed the choir leader in the 2004 motion picture The Ladykillers by the Coen brothers.

Discography

References

External links
 
 Rickey Grundy Chorale Cross Rhythms Artist Profile

1959 births
2015 deaths
African-American songwriters
African-American Christians
Musicians from Los Angeles
Songwriters from California
Sparrow Records artists
20th-century African-American people
21st-century African-American people